The Cymru Alliance League (known for sponsorship reasons as Huws Gray Alliance) was a football league in north and central Wales which formed the second level of the Welsh football league system. From the 2019/20 season onwards, it was replaced by the Cymru North.  

If the team which finished top of the league held a Domestic Licence, it could apply for promotion to the Welsh Premier League and was replaced by one of the bottom two teams in the Welsh Premier League.

If the league champions did not hold a Domestic Licence, then the team which finished second, if in possession of a Domestic Licence, could be promoted instead. The most successful club in the league was Caernarfon Town with three titles.

The Cymru Alliance also operated the Cymru Alliance League Cup, a knock out competition contested by members of the league

The teams also participated in Welsh Cup, the main Cup competition in Wales.

Teams in the final 2018–19 season

Cymru Alliance Winners (1990–2019)

Performance by club

See also
List of association football competitions
Welsh Football League

References

 
Sports leagues established in 1990
1990 establishments in Wales
Wales
Defunct football competitions in Wales
2019 disestablishments in Wales
Sports leagues disestablished in 2019